OCSA may refer to: 
Orange County School of the Arts
Orthodox Christian Scout Association